Preetham J. Gowda is a Karnataka MLA from the Bharatiya Janata Party. He was elected as the Member of Legislative Assembly from Hassan constituency in 2018. In 2020, Gowda made a statement against the Karnataka Governments decision to re-open schools, by saying that he won't send his children to school. He got into an argument with Karnataka minister, V Somanna over the visit of Chief Minister Basavaraj Bommai to former Prime Minister, HD Deve Gowda. Preetham J. Gowda said he was disappointed with the visit while Somanna said that it was ok for two senior leaders to meet.

References 

Karnataka MLAs 2018–2023
Bharatiya Janata Party politicians from Karnataka
Living people
Year of birth missing (living people)